Suzanne Brigit Bird (born October 16, 1980) is an American former professional basketball player who played her entire career with the Seattle Storm of the Women's National Basketball Association (WNBA) Bird was drafted by the Storm first overall in the 2002 WNBA draft and is considered to be one of the greatest players in WNBA history.  As of 2021, Bird is the only WNBA player to win titles in three different decades.  She held a front office position for the NBA's Denver Nuggets as their Basketball Operations Associate. She has also played for three teams in Russia. She holds both U.S. and Israeli citizenship. 

In high school, she was the New York State Player of the Year, the New York Daily News Player of the Year, and a WBCA All-American. In her senior year on the undefeated University of Connecticut team in 2002, she won the Wade Trophy and the Naismith Award as College Player of the Year. She finished her UConn career ranked first in three-point field goal percentage and free throw percentage, second in assists and steals, and as a three-time winner of the Nancy Lieberman Award as the top point guard in the nation, while leading her team to a record of 114–4.

Bird has won a joint-record four WNBA championships with the Storm (2004, 2010, 2018, 2020), a historic five Olympic gold medals (2004, 2008, 2012, 2016, and 2020),  two NCAA Championships with UConn (2000, 2002); and four FIBA World Cups (2002, 2010, 2014, 2018). She is one of only 11 women to attain all four accolades. She is also a five-time EuroLeague Women champion (2007-2010, 2013). During her WNBA career, she has been selected to thirteen WNBA All-Star teams and eight All-WNBA teams. Additionally, she was voted by fans as one of the WNBA's Top 15 Players of All Time in 2011, was voted into the WNBA Top 20@20 as one of the league's top 20 players of all time in 2016, and was voted into The W25 as one of the league's top 25 players of all time in 2021. Her fifth Olympic gold medal, at the 2020 Olympic Games in Tokyo, makes her one of only two Olympic basketball players—of either gender—ever to win five gold medals, with the other player being her US Olympic teammate Diana Taurasi.

Bird publicly confirmed on June 16, 2022 that she will retire from playing professional basketball after the 2022 WNBA season.
Her season ended on September 7, 2022 with the Storm's playoff loss to the Las Vegas Aces.

Early life
Bird was born in Syosset, Nassau County, New York, on Long Island to Herschel and Nancy Bird. She has one sibling, an older sister named Jen. Her father's ancestry is Russian-Jewish, and their original last name was "Boorda". She is also an Israeli citizen since 2006, on account of her Jewish father and paternal grandparents, but she represents her birth country, the United States, in international competitions.

Bird was interested in sports from an early age, which was partly influenced by her athletic older sister. Besides basketball, she played soccer and tennis and ran track. Bird started playing Amateur Athletic Union basketball in the sixth grade. While only 11 years old, she played during halftime of a St. John's basketball game; her play was so impressive that a security guard asked for her autograph.

High school
Bird played her freshman and sophomore years at Syosset High School, but wanted more competition. She therefore enrolled at Christ the King Regional High School in Queens, New York. Bird spent two seasons at Christ the King, and the Royals went 24–3 her junior year. In the second season her team finished undefeated and won the New York state championship, and the national title. Bird won many awards, including the New York State Player of the Year, and the New York Daily News Player of the Year. Bird was named a WBCA All-American. She participated in the Women's Basketball Coaches Association High School All-America Game, where she scored 11 points.

College
Bird was recruited by a number of teams including Stanford and Vanderbilt. She considered UConn the favorite, but she began to waver when Keirsten Walters and Brianne Stepherson, both point guards, announced commitments to UConn. She worried that there might not be room for her to play. However, when Stepherson changed her mind and committed to Boston College, Bird committed to UConn. In addition to increased opportunity, UConn was close to home and "felt right" to her. Eight games into her freshman season, Bird suffered a torn ACL. Since she had played more than 20% of team's games the 1998–1999 season, she was not able to redshirt. In her sophomore season (1999–2000), she came back to lead the team to a 36–1 record, the Big East Championship, and the 2000 NCAA Division I women's basketball tournament.  In her junior season (2000–2001), the Huskies went 32–3, with the final loss coming against UConn's Big East rival Notre Dame in the Final Four. This game would be the last loss in Bird's college career, as the Huskies went 39–0 in 2001–2002, her senior season. In that season, she also won the Wade Trophy, Honda Sports Award and Naismith Award as College Player of the Year.

During her junior year, Bird played in a game against Notre Dame referred to as "the best women's basketball game ever played". The game was memorialized in a book, Bird at the Buzzer, in which Bird took the eponymous shot at the buzzer to win the game.

She finished her UConn career on many of the record lists. She currently ranks No. 24 on the 1,000-point list with 1,378 points, No. 2 in assists with 585, and seventh with 243 steals. She ranks number 1 in three-point field goal percentage (45.9) and free throw percentage (89.2). She won two National Championships, three Big East Championships and Big East regular season titles. Bird was the inaugural winner of the Nancy Lieberman Award in 2000, given to the top point guard in the nation, and won the award again in 2001 and 2002. Overall, her record at UConn in games she played is a remarkable 114–4. Bird was a member of the inaugural class (2006) of inductees to the University of Connecticut women's basketball "Huskies of Honor" recognition program.

College statistics
Source

Professional career

WNBA

The Seattle Storm selected Bird with the first overall pick of the 2002 WNBA draft. She would play alongside superstar Lauren Jackson who was also drafted first overall the year before. In her rookie season, Bird started all 32 games for the Storm and averaged 14.4 ppg. She was selected as a starter on the 2002 WNBA Western Conference All-Star team. Bird was the runner-up for the Rookie of the Year award, and one of only two rookies to make the All-WNBA First Team. Both Bird and Jackson led the Storm to their first playoff appearance. During her first year in the league, Bird scored a career-high 33 points in a regular-season game against the Portland Fire. Since her rookie season she has continuously been selected to the Western Conference All-Star team.

In 2004, the Storm acquired shooting guard Betty Lennox in a dispersal draft, joining forces with Bird and Lauren Jackson, forming a dominant trio of star players to carry the Storm to its first WNBA Championship. By winning the WNBA Championship, Bird became one of 11 women to receive an Olympic gold medal, an NCAA Championship, and a WNBA Championship. The others are Sheryl Swoopes, Cynthia Cooper-Dyke, Tamika Catchings, Brittney Griner and fellow Huskies Swin Cash, Kara Wolters, Diana Taurasi, Maya Moore, Breanna Stewart, and Asjha Jones.

En route to the Storm's second championship, Bird had one of the most clutch moments in WNBA Playoff history; during the Conference Finals against the championship-defending Phoenix Mercury with the Storm up 1–0 in the series, Bird hit a game winning three-pointer with two seconds left in Game 2 to put the Storm up 91–88, after erasing a 19-point deficit to advance to the 2010 WNBA Finals. Also in Game 1 of the 2010 WNBA Finals, Bird hit a game winning jump shot with 2 seconds left to put the Storm up 79–77 and would later sweep the series. In 2011, she was voted in by fans as one of the Top 15 players in the 15-year history of the WNBA.

During the 2012 WNBA season, Bird had been having problems with her knee. Bird was still able to play 29 games during the regular season and in the playoffs. In the off-season, Bird had knee surgery which would prevent her from playing the entire 2013 season.

Bird would come back healthy for the 2014 WNBA season, she played 33 games, averaged 10.6 ppg and 4.6 apg. She was voted as a WNBA all-star that year. However the Storm never made it to the playoffs and would also fail to make the playoffs the following year.

On February 16, 2016, Bird re-signed with the Storm to a multi-year deal in free agency.

In the 2016 season, Bird would have a resurgence, putting up her best numbers since coming back from knee surgery. She averaged 12.8 ppg while shooting a career-high in 3-point field goal percentage and led the league in assists with 5.8 apg. For the fifth time in her career, Bird was named to the All-WNBA First Team for the first time in 12 years. Prior to the season, the Storm selected Breanna Stewart first overall in the 2016 WNBA draft, their second number one overall pick in a row after drafting Jewell Loyd the year before. With the addition of Stewart and Loyd quickly developing into a star player, the Storm made it back to the playoffs for the first time in 3 years with a 16–18 record. With the WNBA's new playoff format in effect, the Storm were the number 7 seed in the league and faced the Atlanta Dream in the first round, losing the single elimination game 94–85. Bird was also listed in the WNBA Top 20@20, a list of the league's best 20 players ever in celebration of the WNBA's twentieth anniversary.

In April 2017, it was announced by the Storm that Bird had undergone left knee surgery earlier in the month, which caused her to miss training camp. She was ruled out indefinitely. On May 21, 2017, Bird returned after recovering from knee surgery and made her season debut, making her both the oldest active player and the oldest starter in the WNBA. She scored 9 points along with 10 assists in an 81–71 victory over the Washington Mystics. On June 11, 2017, Bird scored a season-high 21 points along with 10 assists in a 94–86 loss to the New York Liberty. Bird was voted into the 2017 WNBA All-Star Game, making it her 10th all-star game appearance (tying Tamika Catchings for most all-star game appearances). She had set the All-Star Game record for assists with a performance of 8 points along with 11 assists for the Western Conference All-Stars team in a 130–121 victory. On September 1, 2017, Bird became the WNBA all-time leader in assists with a career total of 2,600 assists, passing Ticha Penicheiro in a 110–106 overtime loss to the Washington Mystics. She finished the game with 19 points along with a season-high of 13 assists. Bird would finish off the 2017 season, averaging a career-high in assists per game as the Storm finished 15–19 with the 8th seed in the league. The Storm would lose 79–69 to the Phoenix Mercury in the first round elimination game.

On July 8, 2018, Bird scored a season-high 21 points in a 97–91 victory over the Washington Mystics. During that game she became the Storm's all-time leading scorer, passing Lauren Jackson's 6,007 points. On July 19, 2018, Bird was voted into the 2018 WNBA All-Star Game, passing Tamika Catchings for most all-star appearances. On July 22, 2018, Bird broke yet another record, this time for the most WNBA regular-season games played after she passed Delisha Milton-Jones by playing her 500th game against the Atlanta Dream. By the end of the season, Bird finished with a career-high in assists, field goal shooting and a new career-high in three-point shooting percentage as the Storm finished as the number 1 seed in the league with a 26–8 record, receiving a double-bye to the semi-finals and home court advantage throughout the playoffs. In the semi-finals, the Storm defeated the Phoenix Mercury in a hard-fought five-game series. The Storm had a 2–0 lead, lost two in a row and finished off the series with a win in game 5 at home. Bird scored a season-high 22 points in game 5. With that win, the Storm would advance to the WNBA Finals for the first time since 2010. In the Finals, they would sweep the Washington Mystics, winning their first championship in 8 years.

During the first week of the 2019 season, Bird was sidelined as she once again underwent left knee surgery and was ruled out indefinitely. By September 2019, it was announced that Bird would not return, causing her to miss the entire season. Without Bird, the Storm were unable to defend their title as they were eliminated in the second round elimination game by the Los Angeles Sparks.

In 2020, Bird would be fully healthy and make her return for the Storm. The season was delayed and shortened to 22 games in a bubble at IMG Academy due to the COVID-19 pandemic. She had reaggravated her knee during the season, causing her to miss half of the games, with a fully healthy and active roster, the Storm finished 18–4 with the number 2 seed, receiving a double bye to the semi-finals. In the semi-finals they would sweep the Minnesota Lynx in three games, advancing back to the WNBA Finals for the second time in three years. In the Finals, the Storm would win the championship after defeating the Las Vegas Aces in a three-game sweep, earning Bird her fourth WNBA championship, making her the first player in WNBA history to win a championship in three different decades.

In 2021, Bird re-signed with the Storm on a one-year deal, which allowed her to play her 18th season in the league, moving her past Milton-Jones for most seasons played in the WNBA. In a July 2021 game against the Los Angeles Sparks Bird's first three-pointer put her number sixth on the WNBA career scoring list, passing Katie Smith's 6452 points with a total of 6490 points (as of August 2021) and counting. During that season, the WNBA's 25th, she was named to The W25, the league's official list of the 25 greatest players in its history.

Overseas

In the 2004–05 WNBA off-season, she played in Russia, with Storm teammate Kamila Vodichkova on the Dynamo Moscow. In the 2005–06 WNBA off-season, she played on the same team, reaching the Russian championship and the Euroleague women's playoffs.

In the 2006–07 WNBA off-season, she joined Storm teammate Lauren Jackson and fellow UConn stars Diana Taurasi and Svetlana Abrosimova on the Russian team Spartak Moscow Region to win both the Russian Super League and the EuroLeague Women championships. Bird would keep playing with the team for the next four WNBA off-seasons.

From 2011 to 2014, Bird played three off-seasons for UMMC Ekaterinburg in the Russian League winning three consecutive championships with the team.

National team career
She competed with USA Basketball as a member of the 2000 Jones Cup Team in Taipei, Taiwan. Bird started all four games, and led the team with 17 assists, helping lead the team to the gold medal.

In 2002, Bird was named to the national team which competed in the World Championships in Zhangjiagang, Changzhou and Nanjing, China. The team was coached by Van Chancellor. Bird scored 4.3 points per game. The USA team won all nine games, including a close title game against Russia, which was a one-point game late in the game.

In the 2003–2004 off-season, Bird was named to the United States 2004 Women's Olympic Basketball Team's roster. The USA team would go on to win the gold at the games in Athens, Greece.

In 2006, Bird was invited back to the National team for the World Championships held in Sao Paulo, Brazil in September 2006. With the retirements of Lisa Leslie and Dawn Staley and injuries to Sheryl Swoopes, Bird, along with Candace Parker and Diana Taurasi stepped up to leading roles on the national team. The USA team won eight of the nine games they played, but fell against Russia 75–68 in the medal round, so ended up with the bronze medal. Over the nine games, Bird hit 50% of her three-point attempts, tying her for accuracy leadership along with Taurasi and Swoopes. Bird led the team with 41 assists.

In the summer of 2008, she was invited back to be on the 2008 Olympic basketball team.  The team won the gold medal in Beijing, China. Bird started all eight games, and led the team in steals, with 14.

Bird was invited to the USA Basketball Women's National Team training camp in the fall of 2009. The team selected to play for the 2010 FIBA World Championship and the 2012 Olympics is usually chosen from these participants. At the conclusion of the training camp, the team will travel to Ekaterinburg, Russia, where they compete in the 2009 UMMC Ekaterinburg International Invitational.

In 2010, Bird was named as one of the National team members to represent the USA Basketball team in the WNBA versus USA Basketball. This game replaces the normal WNBA All-Star game with WNBA All-Stars versus USA Basketball, as part of the preparation for the FIBA World Championship for Women to be held in the Czech Republic during September and October 2010. Bird was selected to be a member of the National team representing the US at the World Championships held in September and October 2010. The team was coached by Geno Auriemma. Because many team members were still playing in the WNBA until just prior to the event, the team had only one day of practice with the entire team before leaving for Ostrava and Karlovy Vary, Czech Republic. Even with limited practice, the team managed to win its first games against Greece by 26 points. The team continued to dominate with victory margins exceeding 20 points in the first five games. Several players shared scoring honors, with Swin Cash, Angel McCoughtry, Maya Moore, Diana Taurasi, Lindsay Whalen, and Sylvia Fowles all ending as high scorer in the first few games. The sixth game was against undefeated Australia — the USA jumped out to a 24-point lead and the USA prevailed 83–75. The USA won its next two games by over 30 points, then faced the host team, the Czech Republic, in the championship game. The USA team had only a five-point lead at halftime, which was cut to three points, but the Czechs never got closer. Team USA went on to win the championship and gold medal. Bird averaged 5.6 points per game and led the team in assists with 26.

Bird competed for the U.S. in the 2012 Summer Olympics. The Americans won their fifth straight gold medal.

In 2014, Bird had competed for Team USA during the 2014 FIBA World Championship for Women, in which they defeated Spain 77–64 to win the gold medal.

Bird competed for Team USA in the 2016 Summer Olympics, helping the team win its sixth straight gold medal, as they beat Spain 101–72 in the gold medal game. This was Bird's fourth Olympic title.

In 2018, Bird competed for Team USA during the 2018 FIBA Women's Basketball World Cup held in Spain, in which they defeated Australia 73–56 to win the gold medal. By winning the gold medal, Bird became the only player in history, male or female, to win four World Cup gold medals. Bird finished the final with five assists to bring her career total to 107 assists in FIBA World Cup – making her the leader for the U.S. most assists at the World Cup.

On July 23, 2021, in the lead-up to her quest for her fifth gold medal, Bird carried the  flag at the opening ceremony of the Tokyo Summer Olympics. Bird and baseball player Eddy Alvarez were selected as the flag bearers by their fellow athletes. Bird called the honor “mind-blowing.” The Games were delayed from 2020 due to the COVID-19 pandemic.

WNBA career statistics

Career achievements
Only player to win a WNBA championship in three different decades (2004, 2010, 2018, 2020)
Oldest player in WNBA history to play a whole season. 41 yrs, 246 days. (Note: Nancy Lieberman played 9 minutes in 1 game at age 50 years 23 days.)

Top 10 all-time in:
1st in most season played (20)
1st in Games Played (580)
1st in assists (3,234)
1st in minutes Played (18,080)
1st in All-Star appearances (13) 
1st in Turnovers (1,393)
2nd in 3-pointers made (1,001) 	
2nd in 3-point attempts (2,551)
3rd in steals (725)
5th in Field goal attempts (5,778)
6th in Field goals made (3,299)
6th in Field Goals missed (3,233)
7th in Points (6,803)

Regular season

|-
| style="text-align:left;"| 2002
| style="text-align:left;"| Seattle
| style="background:#D3D3D3"|32° || style="background:#D3D3D3"|32° || 35.0 || .403 || .401 || style="background:#D3D3D3"|.911° || 2.6 || 6.0 || 1.7 || 0.1 || 3.4 || 14.4
|-
| style="text-align:left;"| 2003
| style="text-align:left;"| Seattle
| style="background:#D3D3D3"|34° || style="background:#D3D3D3"|34° || 33.4 || .421 || .350 || .884 || 3.3 || 6.5 || 1.4 || 0.0 || 3.2 || 12.4
|-
|style="text-align:left;background:#afe6ba;"| 2004
| style="text-align:left;"| Seattle
| style="background:#D3D3D3"|34° || style="background:#D3D3D3"|34° || 33.4 || .463 || .438|| .859 || 3.1 || 5.4 || 1.5 || 0.2 || 2.5 || 12.9
|-
| style="text-align:left;"| 2005
| style="text-align:left;"| Seattle
| 30 || 30 || 34.0 || .442 || .437 || .855 || 2.4 || style="background:#D3D3D3"|5.9° || 1.0 || 0.2 || 2.9 || 12.1
|-
| style="text-align:left;"| 2006
| style="text-align:left;"| Seattle
| style="background:#D3D3D3"|34° || style="background:#D3D3D3"|34° || 31.3 || .411 || .366 || .868 || 3.0 || 4.8 || 1.8 || 0.1 || 2.5 || 11.4
|-
| style="text-align:left;"| 2007
| style="text-align:left;"| Seattle
| 29 || 29 || 31.7 || .428 || .338 || .846 || 2.0 || 4.9 || 1.5 || 0.3 || 2.3 || 10.4
|-
| style="text-align:left;"| 2008
| style="text-align:left;"| Seattle
| 33 || 33 || 33.7 || .441 || .343 || .871 || 2.5 || 5.1 || 1.2 || 0.1 || 2.6 || 14.1
|-
| style="text-align:left;"| 2009
| style="text-align:left;"| Seattle
| 31 || 31 || style="background:#D3D3D3"|35.5° || .408 || .360 || .854 || 2.5 || style="background:#D3D3D3"|5.8° || 1.5 || 0.1 || 2.6 || 12.8
|-
|style="text-align:left;background:#afe6ba;"| 2010†
| style="text-align:left;"| Seattle
| 33 || 33 || 30.5 || .434 || .399 || .857 || 2.7 || 5.8 || 1.5 || 0.2 || 1.8 || 11.1
|-
| style="text-align:left;"| 2011
| style="text-align:left;"| Seattle
| style="background:#D3D3D3"|34° || style="background:#D3D3D3"|34° || 33.0 || .449 || .428 || .875 || 2.9 || 4.9 || 1.4 || 0.2 || 2.3 || 14.7
|-
| style="text-align:left;"| 2012
| style="text-align:left;"| Seattle
| 29 || 29 || 31.0 || .459 || .384 || .783 || 2.9 || 5.3 || 0.9 || 0.1 || 2.2 || 12.2
|-
| style="text-align:left;"| 2014
| style="text-align:left;"| Seattle
| 33 || 33 || 29.2 || .386 || .345 || .831 || 2.2 || 4.0 || 0.8 || 0.0 || 2.2 || 10.6
|-
| style="text-align:left;"| 2015
| style="text-align:left;"| Seattle
| 27 || 27 || 28.6 || .384 || .301 || .796 || 2.3 || 5.4 || 0.9 || 0.1 || 2.4 || 10.3
|-
| style="text-align:left;"| 2016
| style="text-align:left;"| Seattle
| style="background:#D3D3D3"|34° || style="background:#D3D3D3"|34° || 31.6 || .449 || .444  || .786 || 2.9 || style="background:#D3D3D3"|5.8° || 1.0 || 0.2 || 2.5 || 12.8
|-
| style="text-align:left;"| 2017
| style="text-align:left;"| Seattle
| 30 || 30|| 30.0 || .427 || .393  || .774 || 2.0 || 6.6 || 1.2 || 0.2 || 2.0 || 10.6
|-
|style="text-align:left;background:#afe6ba;"| 2018†
| style="text-align:left;"| Seattle
| 31 || 31|| 26.5 || .466 || .448  || .828 || 1.7 || 7.1 || 1.1 || 0.1 || 1.9 || 10.1
|-
|style="text-align:left;background:#afe6ba;"| 2020†
| style="text-align:left;"| Seattle
| 11 || 11|| 23.4 || .494 || .469  || .750 || 1.7 || 5.2 || 0.6 || 0.2 || 1.6 || 9.8
|-
|style="text-align:left;"| 2021
| style="text-align:left;"| Seattle
| 30 || 30|| 27.7 || .431 || .419  || .833 || 2.6 || 5.3 || 0.9 || 0.1 || 1.6 || 10.0
|-
|style="text-align:left;"| 2022
| style="text-align:left;"| Seattle
| 31 || 31|| 26.4 || .403 || .389  || 1.000 || 1.9 || 6.0 || 1.2 || 0.1 || 1.9 || 7.8
|-
| style="text-align:left;"| Career
| style="text-align:left;"|19 years, 1 team
| bgcolor="EOCEF2" |580 || bgcolor="EOCEF2" |580 || 31.2 || .429 || .392 || .853 || 2.5 || 5.6 || 1.3 || 0.1 || 2.4 || 11.7

Postseason

|-
| style="text-align:left;"| 2002
| style="text-align:left;"| Seattle
| 2 || 2 || 36.5 || .409 || .273 || 1.000 || 0.0 || 6.0 || 2.5 || 0.0 || 2.5 || 14.0
|-
|style="text-align:left;background:#afe6ba;"| 2004†
| style="text-align:left;"| Seattle
| 8 || 8 || 29.1 || .377 || .300 || .762 || 3.2 || 5.2 || 1.5 || 0.0 || 2.0 || 8.5
|-
| style="text-align:left;"| 2005
| style="text-align:left;"| Seattle
| 3 || 3 || 34.3 || .273 || .133 || .875 || 1.7 || 4.3 || 1.0 || 0.0 || 1.3 || 9.0
|-
| style="text-align:left;"| 2006
| style="text-align:left;"| Seattle
| 3 || 3 || 35.0 || .361 || .333 || .625 || 2.7 || 3.3 || 0.3 || 0.7 || 2.3 || 12.7
|-
| style="text-align:left;"| 2007
| style="text-align:left;"| Seattle
| 2 || 2 || 35.5 || .458 || .583 || 1.000 || 2.0 || 5.0 || 2.0 || 0.0 || 3.0 || 16.5
|-
| style="text-align:left;"| 2008
| style="text-align:left;"| Seattle
| 3 || 3 || 37.0 || .460 || .294 || 1.000 || 2.3 || 3.0 || 1.3 || 0.0 || 2.0 || 19.7
|-
| style="text-align:left;"| 2009
| style="text-align:left;"| Seattle
| 3 || 3 || 36.3 || .333 || .417 || .875 || 3.7 || 4.0 || 1.3 || 0.0 || 2.3 || 11.3
|-
|style="text-align:left;background:#afe6ba;"| 2010†
| style="text-align:left;"| Seattle
| 7 || 7 || 37.0 || .386 || .333 || .769 || 4.1 || 7.7 || 1.7 || 0.4 || 2.0 || 12.1
|-
| style="text-align:left;"| 2011
| style="text-align:left;"| Seattle
| 3 || 3 || 33.7 || .444 || .500 || .857 || 4.0 || 2.7 || 1.0 || 0.0 || 0.6 || 15.7
|-
| style="text-align:left;"| 2012
| style="text-align:left;"| Seattle
| 3 || 3 || 35.3 || .439 || .500 || .833 || 1.7 || 7.0 || 1.7 || 0.7 || 3.3 || 16.3
|-
| style="text-align:left;"| 2016
| style="text-align:left;"| Seattle
| 1 || 1 || 34.2 || .357 || .333 || .000 || 5.0 || 7.0 || 3.0 || 0.0 || 2.0 || 12.0
|-
| style="text-align:left;"| 2017
| style="text-align:left;"| Seattle
| 1 || 1 || 31.0 || .444 || .333 || 1.000 || 2.0 || 5.0 || 0.0 || 0.0 || 2.0 || 10.0
|-
|style="text-align:left;background:#afe6ba;"| 2018†
| style="text-align:left;"| Seattle
| 8 || 8 || 28.4 || .387 || .364 || .750 || 2.8 || 6.9 || 0.7 || 0.2 || 1.3 || 10.0
|-
|style="text-align:left;background:#afe6ba;"| 2020†
| style="text-align:left;"| Seattle
| 6 || 6 || 26.5 || .392 || .316 || 1.000 || 2.0 || 9.2 || 0.7 || 0.3 || 2.3 || 9.5
|-
| style="text-align:left;"| 2021
| style="text-align:left;"| Seattle
| 1 || 1 || 37.0 || .417 || .500 || 1.000 || 3.0 || 5.0 || 1.0 || 0.0 || 2.0 || 16.0
|-
| style="text-align:left;"| 2022
| style="text-align:left;"| Seattle
| 6 || 6 || 35.7 || .431 || .433 || 1.000 || 2.2 || 7.7 || 0.8 || 0.2 || 1.0 || 10.2
|-
| style="text-align:left;"| Career
| style="text-align:left;"|16 years, 1 team
| 60 || 60 || 32.9 || .396 || .365 || .845 || 2.7 || 6.1 || 1.2 || 0.2 || 1.9 || 11.7

Awards and honors
WNBA
4× WNBA champion (2004, 2010, 2018, 2020)
Commissioners Cup Champion (2021)
12× WNBA All-Star (2002, 2003, 2005, 2006, 2007, 2009, 2011, 2014, 2015, 2017, 2018, 2021)
5× All-WNBA First Team (2002, 2003, 2004, 2005, 2016)
3× All-WNBA Second Team (2008, 2010, 2011)
3× WNBA assists leader (2005, 2009, 2016)
2× WNBA peak performer (2009, 2016)
All-time Allstar appearances
All-time leader seasons played
All-time Assists leader
All-time leader in Games played
All-time leader in Minutes played
All-time leader Turnovers
WNBA All-Decade Team (2006, Top 10 players from first 10 years)
WNBA Top 15 Players of All Time (2011, Top 15 players from first 15 years)
WNBA Top 20@20 (2016, Top 20 players from first 20 years)
The W25 (2021, Top 25 players from first 25 years)

NCAA
2× NCAA National Champion (2000, 2002)
3× Nancy Lieberman Award (2000, 2001, 2002)
Naismith College Player of the Year (2002)
USBWA Women's National Player of the Year (2002)
Senior CLASS Award (2002)
Big East Conference Women's Basketball Player of the Year (2002)
Honda Sports Award, basketball (2002)

USA Basketball
5× Olympic Gold Medalist (2004, 2008, 2012, 2016, 2020)
4× FIBA World Cup Gold Medalist (2002, 2010, 2014, 2018)
2006 FIBA World Cup Bronze Medalist

EuroLeague
5× EuroLeague Champion (2007, 2008, 2009, 2010, 2013)
2× EuroLeague All-Star (2008,2011)

Media
Associated Press Women's College Basketball Player of the Year (2002)
2002 ESPY Award - Best Female College Athlete

Personal life
Bird publicly came out as a lesbian on July 20, 2017, revealing that she had been dating soccer player Megan Rapinoe for several months. In 2018, she and Rapinoe became the first same-sex couple on the cover of ESPN The Magazines "Body Issue". They announced their engagement on October 30, 2020. She was included in the 2022 Queer 50 list.

See also

 UConn Huskies women's basketball
 List of athletes with the most appearances at Olympic Games
 List of Connecticut women's basketball players with 1000 points
 List of Connecticut Huskies women's basketball players with 500 assists
 List of select Jewish basketball players
 List of WNBA career scoring leaders
 List of WNBA career assists leaders
 List of Women's National Basketball Association career steals leaders
 List of Women's National Basketball Association season assists leaders

References

Bibliography

External links

 (archive)

1980 births
Living people
All-American college women's basketball players
American expatriate basketball people in Russia
American people of Israeli descent
American people of Russian-Jewish descent
American women's basketball players
Basketball players at the 2004 Summer Olympics
Basketball players at the 2008 Summer Olympics
Basketball players at the 2012 Summer Olympics
Basketball players at the 2016 Summer Olympics
Basketball players at the 2020 Summer Olympics
Basketball players from New York (state)
Jewish women's basketball players
Lesbian sportswomen
LGBT basketball players
LGBT Jews
LGBT people from New York (state)
American LGBT sportspeople
Medalists at the 2004 Summer Olympics
Medalists at the 2008 Summer Olympics
Medalists at the 2012 Summer Olympics
Medalists at the 2016 Summer Olympics
Medalists at the 2020 Summer Olympics
NJ/NY Gotham FC owners
Olympic gold medalists for the United States in basketball
People from Syosset, New York
Point guards
Seattle Storm draft picks
Seattle Storm players
Syosset High School alumni
UConn Huskies women's basketball players
Women's National Basketball Association All-Stars
Women's National Basketball Association first-overall draft picks
United States women's national basketball team players
Association footballers' wives and girlfriends